XHNKA-FM (La Voz del Gran Pueblo – "The Voice of the Great People") is an indigenous community radio station that broadcasts in Spanish and Yucatec Maya from Felipe Carrillo Puerto, in the Mexican state of Quintana Roo. It is run by the Cultural Indigenist Broadcasting System (SRCI) of the National Commission for the Development of Indigenous Peoples (CDI).

It began broadcasting on June 15, 1999, as XENKA-AM 1030.

In 2012, XENKA was authorized to move to FM as XHNKA-FM 104.5.

External links
XHNKA website

References

Sistema de Radiodifusoras Culturales Indígenas
Radio stations in Quintana Roo
Yucatec Maya language
Radio stations established in 1999